Alan Belcher (born April 24, 1984) is an American bare-knuckle boxer and former mixed martial artist. A professional from 2004 until 2015, he is perhaps best known for his 15-fight tenure with the UFC. He currently competes in Bare Knuckle Fighting Championship and is the reigning BKFC Heavyweight Champion.

Background
Belcher was born in Jonesboro, Arkansas and began practicing karate when he was eight years old. Belcher later attended Sloan-Hendrix High School in Imboden, Arkansas where he competed in baseball and basketball before continuing his baseball career in junior college. After starting Brazilian jiu-jitsu at the age of 14, Belcher began his amateur mixed martial arts career at the age of 15.

Mixed martial arts career

Early career
Belcher made his professional debut in July 2004 against Tim Ellis in Freestyle Fighting Championship and won by TKO. His MMA career then picked up significantly in early 2006, the year in which Belcher amassed 9 fights, going 8–1.

Ultimate Fighting Championship
In 2006 he lost a unanimous decision at the hands of Yushin Okami at UFC 62 in his UFC debut.

Belcher made his second UFC appearance against Jorge Santiago three months later, winning by stunning head kick KO in the third round of a close fight.

At UFC 69, Belcher lost to The Ultimate Fighter 3 winner Kendall Grove via D'arce choke. Belcher then defeated Sean Salmon one month later at UFC 71 with a guillotine choke 53 seconds into the first round. Belcher took the fight on ten days' notice after Eric Schafer pulled out due to sustaining a broken rib during training. This fight was at 205 pounds.

Belcher then defeated Kalib Starnes at UFC 77 on October 20, 2007. After controlling the fight with punches and knees from the clinch, the fight was eventually stopped in favor of Belcher due to a large gash over Starnes' right eye.

Belcher was scheduled to fight at UFC 81 against Ricardo Almeida, but Belcher had to pull out two days before the fight due to a severe case of bronchitis.

Belcher was scheduled to fight Patrick Cote at UFC 83 in Montreal, but Cote withdrew due to a knee injury. Newcomer Jason Day replaced Cote. Belcher eventually was caught by a punch causing Day to swarm punches at Belcher against the fence. The fight was ruled a TKO in favor of Day in the first round.

After a split decision victory over Ed Herman, Belcher fought Pride FC veteran Denis Kang at UFC 93. Kang won the first round after taking down and controlling Belcher on the ground. However, Kang began to fight more and more conservatively, and when he tried to take Belcher down again late in the second round, Belcher caught him in a tight guillotine choke that made Kang almost immediately tap out, winning him a $45,000 Submission of the Night bonus.

Belcher lost a split decision to Yoshihiro Akiyama, at UFC 100 on July 11, 2009. The fight earned Fight of the Night honors, rewarding both fighters with a record setting $100,000.

Belcher defeated Wilson Gouveia via first round TKO on December 12, 2009 at UFC 107. During the fight, Belcher displayed a good chin and precise punches. The fight was awarded Fight of the Night which rewarded both fighters with $65,000. The award meant Belcher had received three bonuses in a row in 2009.

Belcher defeated Patrick Côté on May 8, 2010, at UFC 113 by way of rear naked choke after a controversial face plant that rocked Cote and enabled Belcher to sneak around to the back and sink in the choke. Belcher received an extra $65,000 for winning the Submission of the Night award which was his fourth consecutive fight night bonus.

Belcher was expected to face Demian Maia on September 15, 2010, at UFC Fight Night: Maia vs. Belcher in his first main event. However, on August 1, 2010, Belcher withdrew from the fight with Maia after undergoing emergency eye surgery. Alan stated on his Twitter account that he started to lose the vision in his right eye whilst in Brazil.

Belcher's manager, Malki Kawa, in April updated his recovery, saying that Belcher was back in training and looking forward to a return to the Octagon in September. The UFC hadn't yet announced many plans for September, although there will be a UFC Fight Night event in New Orleans on September 17, where Belcher would be a natural fit.

Belcher faced Jason MacDonald on September 17, 2011 at UFC Fight Night 25. Belcher stuffed a takedown from MacDonald and ended up on top early in the first round. Belcher quickly postured up and began landing punches and elbows to open Jason's guard. He then passed and continued to punish MacDonald and won the fight via verbal submission due to strikes in the first round.

Belcher next faced Rousimar Palhares on May 5, 2012 at UFC on Fox 3. Despite getting the fight to the ground, Palhares was unable to complete his attempted leg locks and heel hook submissions, and Belcher even attempted a few submissions of his own. Belcher would go on to defeat Palhares via TKO in the first round.

Belcher was expected to face Vitor Belfort on October 13, 2012 at UFC 153. However, Belfort was pulled from the bout to face Jon Jones on September 22, 2012 at UFC 152.  Belcher called the collapse of the UFC 151 a "blessing in disguise" as he would have been unable to compete due to a fractured spine, keeping him out of action until November. He wanted to face Chris Weidman in his return fight.

A rematch with Yushin Okami took place on December 29, 2012 at UFC 155. Belcher lost the bout by unanimous decision.

Belcher faced Michael Bisping on April 27, 2013 at UFC 159. Bisping controlled the majority of the fight due to his conditioning and cardio pushing a constant pace. The bout was stopped at 4:29 of round 3 as Bisping inadvertently poked Belcher in the eye, rendering Belcher unable to continue.  Bisping won the bout via technical unanimous decision. Belcher got eight stitches in his eyelid after the fight.

On November 11, 2015, Belcher announced his retirement from mixed martial arts.

Bare-knuckle boxing
On May 20, 2021 – over five years removed from his retirement – it was announced that Belcher had signed a multi-fight contract with Bare Knuckle Fighting Championship. 

Belcher made his debut against Tony Lopez on August 20, 2021 at BKFC 20. He won the fight by unanimous decision.

Personal life
Belcher has 2 children, Ava & Eli. He currently trains an American Top Team MMA Gym located in D'Iberville, Mississippi.

Championships and accomplishments
Bare Knuckle Fighting Championship
BKFC Heavyweight Champion (One time, current) 
Ultimate Fighting Championship
Fight of the Night (Two times) vs. Wilson Gouveia, Yoshihiro Akiyama 
Submission of the Night (Two times) vs. Denis Kang, Patrick Cote

Mixed martial arts record

|-
| Loss
| align=center| 18–8
| Michael Bisping
| Technical Decision (unanimous)
| UFC 159
| 
| align=center| 3
| align=center| 4:31
| Newark, New Jersey, United States
| 
|-
| Loss
| align=center| 18–7
| Yushin Okami
| Decision (unanimous)
| UFC 155
| 
| align=center| 3
| align=center| 5:00
| Las Vegas, Nevada, United States
| 
|-
| Win
| align=center| 18–6
| Rousimar Palhares
| TKO (punches and elbows)
| UFC on Fox: Diaz vs. Miller
| 
| align=center| 1
| align=center| 4:18
| East Rutherford, New Jersey, United States
| 
|-
| Win
| align=center| 17–6
| Jason MacDonald
| TKO (submission to punches)
| UFC Fight Night: Shields vs. Ellenberger
| 
| align=center| 1
| align=center| 3:48
| New Orleans, Louisiana, United States
| 
|-
| Win
| align=center| 16–6
| Patrick Côté
| Submission (rear-naked choke)
| UFC 113
| 
| align=center| 2
| align=center| 3:25
| Montreal, Quebec, Canada
| 
|-
| Win
| align=center| 15–6
| Wilson Gouveia
| TKO (punches)
| UFC 107
| 
| align=center| 1
| align=center| 3:03
| Memphis, Tennessee, United States
| 
|-
| Loss
| align=center| 14–6
| Yoshihiro Akiyama
| Decision (split)
| UFC 100
| 
| align=center| 3
| align=center| 5:00
| Las Vegas, Nevada, United States
| 
|-
| Win
| align=center| 14–5
| Denis Kang
| Submission (guillotine choke)
| UFC 93
| 
| align=center| 2
| align=center| 4:36
| Dublin, Ireland
| 
|-
| Win
| align=center| 13–5
| Ed Herman
| Decision (split)
| UFC Fight Night: Diaz vs. Neer
| 
| align=center| 3
| align=center| 5:00
| Omaha, Nebraska, United States
| 
|-
| Loss
| align=center| 12–5
| Jason Day
| TKO (punches)
| UFC 83
| 
| align=center| 1
| align=center| 3:58
| Montreal, Quebec, Canada
| 
|-
| Win
| align=center| 12–4
| Kalib Starnes
| TKO (doctor stoppage)
| UFC 77
| 
| align=center| 2
| align=center| 1:39
| Cincinnati, Ohio, United States
| 
|-
| Win
| align=center| 11–4
| Sean Salmon
| Submission (guillotine choke)
| UFC 71
| 
| align=center| 1
| align=center| 0:53
| Las Vegas, Nevada, United States
| 
|-
| Loss
| align=center| 10–4
| Kendall Grove
| Submission (D'arce choke)
| UFC 69
| 
| align=center| 2
| align=center| 4:42
| Houston, Texas, United States
| 
|-
| Win
| align=center| 10–3
| Jorge Santiago
| KO (head kick)
| UFC Fight Night: Sanchez vs. Riggs
| 
| align=center| 3
| align=center| 2:45
| San Diego, California, United States
| 
|-
| Loss
| align=center| 9–3
| Yushin Okami
| Decision (unanimous)
| UFC 62
| 
| align=center| 3
| align=center| 5:00
| Las Vegas, Nevada, United States
|Middleweight debut.
|-
| Win
| align=center| 9–2
| Evert Fyeet
| Submission (toe hold)
| WEF: Orleans Arena
| 
| align=center| 1
| align=center| 2:04
| Las Vegas, Nevada, United States
| 
|-
| Win
| align=center| 8–2
| Buck Meredith
| Decision (unanimous)
| Raze MMA: Fight Night
| 
| align=center| 3
| align=center| 5:00
| San Diego, California, United States
| 
|-
| Win
| align=center| 7–2
| Marcus Sursa
| TKO (punches)
| World Extreme Fighting 17
| 
| align=center| 1
| align=center| 3:48
| Las Vegas, Nevada, United States
| 
|-
| Win
| align=center| 6–2
| Ron Fields
| TKO (slam)
| Titan FC 1
| 
| align=center| 1
| align=center| 0:37
| Kansas City, Kansas, United States
| 
|-
| Win
| align=center| 5–2
| David Frank
| TKO (submission to punches)
| XFL: EK 19: Battle at the Brady 3
| 
| align=center| 2
| align=center| 1:37
| Tulsa, Oklahoma, United States
| 
|-
| Win
| align=center| 4–2
| Roger Kimes
| KO (punches)
| XFL: EK 19: Battle at the Brady 3
| 
| align=center| 1
| align=center| 1:35
| Tulsa, Oklahoma, United States
| 
|-
| Win
| align=center| 3–2
| Travis Fowler
| TKO (punches)
| XFL: EK 19: Battle at the Brady 3
| 
| align=center| 1
| align=center| 1:01
| Tulsa, Oklahoma, United States
| 
|-
| Loss
| align=center| 2–2
| Marvin Eastman
| Decision (unanimous)
| World Extreme Fighting 16
| 
| align=center| 5
| align=center| 5:00
| Enid, Oklahoma, United States
|Light Heavyweight debut.
|-
| Loss
| align=center| 2–1
| Edwin Aguilar
| TKO (punches)
| WXF: X-Impact World Championships
| 
| align=center| 1
| align=center| 4:01
| Korea
| 
|-
| Win
| align=center| 2–0
| Sergei Trovnikov
| Submission (armbar)
| WXF: X-Impact World Championships
| 
| align=center| 1
| align=center| 3:37
| Korea
| 
|-
| Win
| align=center| 1–0
| Tim Ellis
| TKO (punches)
| Freestyle Fighting Championships 10
| 
| align=center| 1
| align=center| 1:49
| Tunica, Mississippi, United States
|

Bare knuckle boxing record

|-
|Win
|align=center|4–0
|Arnold Adams
|KO (punches)
|BKFC 36
|
|align=center|3
|align=center|0:55
|Kenner, Louisiana, United States
|
|-
|Win
|align=center|3–0
|Frank Tate
|KO (punch)
|BKFC Fight Night: Jackson 2
|
|align=center|1
|align=center|1:21
|Jackson, Mississippi, United States
|
|-
|Win
|align=center|2–0
|Bobo O'Bannon	
|KO (punch)
|BKFC Fight Night: Jackson
|
|align=center|1
|align=center|1:48
|Jackson, Mississippi, United States
|
|-
|Win
|align=center|1–0
|Tony Lopez
|Decision (unanimous)
|BKFC 20
|
|align=center|5
|align=center|2:00
|Biloxi, Mississippi, United States
|

Grappling Record

See also
 List of current UFC fighters
 List of male mixed martial artists

References

External links

Official UFC Profile

Living people
1984 births
People from Jonesboro, Arkansas
Sportspeople from Biloxi, Mississippi
American male mixed martial artists
Mixed martial artists from Mississippi
Middleweight mixed martial artists
Mixed martial artists utilizing taekwondo
Mixed martial artists utilizing judo
Mixed martial artists utilizing Brazilian jiu-jitsu
Bare-knuckle boxers 
American practitioners of Brazilian jiu-jitsu
People awarded a black belt in Brazilian jiu-jitsu
American male taekwondo practitioners
American male judoka
Ultimate Fighting Championship male fighters